Faiz Karizi (born 1953) is a popular Afghan singer.  He is ranked as the most prolific folkloric singer of Afghanistan and has been referred to as that country's “King of Folklore Music.”  Now based out of Sweden, he often tours Europe, United States and most recently Australia for performances.

Background 
Faiz was born in 1953 on Kariz of Bamyan Province. During his high school years he participated in social activities, prompting him to enter the music scene of those gatherings.  He was reportedly a very avid learner of music and when he started singing, he was able to make a wide following among his schoolmates during this time.  With the encouragement of his peers and also his instructors, he was urged to sing professionally as a folk singer.  Thus began a journey of fame for the graduate. He sings in Dari, Hazaragi and sometimes in Pashto.

Fame 
Faiz first appeared on Afghanistan's national television in 1978.  He quickly became a renowned singer, his fame paralleling the initial and quick rising popularity of his high school years. During this time he started recording various albums, most of them of his live performances. He became so popular that by the early to mid 80s, he was ranked as the most popular singer in that country. Although most of his songs were folkloric in nature and some renditions of other pop songs, he eclipsed all other singers for public adulation. By late 80s, he became a household name and the first choice wedding singer. During his rise, he regularly performed with Beltoon and Hamidullah Charikari, amongst others.

After a brief period in Peshawar, Pakistan, he emigrated to Europe and now resides permanently in Sweden, continuing his music career in exile, alongside his sons who form part of his backing musical party.

External links 
 Fazi Karizi’s Official Website

1953 births
Living people
Afghan musicians
People from Kabul
Afghan Tajik people
Afghan male singers
Persian-language singers
Afghan emigrants to Sweden
Afghan expatriates in Sweden
20th-century Afghan male singers
21st-century Afghan male singers